The Last Man to Hang? is a 1956 crime film directed by Terence Fisher. It stars Tom Conway and Elizabeth Sellars. The film was produced by John Gossage for Act Films Ltd.

Plot

Music critic Sir Roderick Strood is having an affair with a beautiful singer, Elizabeth Anders. In a storyline which appears partly in flashback and partly in real time, his wife Daphne refuses to give him a divorce and subsequently tries to shoot herself, but after apparently becoming reconciled to the situation tells Roderick to leave the country with the singer and that she shall see him on the other side. Sir Roderick gives his wife a strong sedative, given him by his mistress, not knowing that his wife's housekeeper, Mrs Tucker, has already given her a sedative. Daphne apparently dies of an overdose, though an early scene of her arrival at hospital has in fact made it clear that she is still alive, and that Mrs Tucker has deliberately mis-identified the body of another woman, brought to hospital at the same time, as Daphne's.

Stopped at the airport Sir Roderick says "I've killed her" and is arrested and charged with murder.

A jury must decide whether Sir Roderick poisoned his wife deliberately, or whether her death was accidental. Several references to the debate about the abolition of capital punishment that was going on in British society in the 1950s are made. One protracted jury room scene recalls the play for television Twelve Angry Men, which had been shown on US TV in 1954. The cast includes several actors who would later become household names.

The trial focuses on the semantic difference between "I've killed her" and "I killed her", and on the question of whether Sir Roderick could have heard Mrs Tucker's voice, warning him not to give his wife a sedative as she had already done so, through a closed door. A demonstration that he might not have heard the housekeeper is enough to convince the jury and he is found not guilty.

Following the trial Sir Roderick returns home, but Mrs Tucker, despite having made every attempt to have Sir Roderick convicted and hanged, now admits that she knew he had not killed his wife as she is not dead. Having heard Roderick confess in the witness box that he still loved his wife and not Elizabeth, Mrs Tucker takes him to his wife (hiding in a large country cottage) where the police, whom Mrs Tucker has tipped off, wait outside to arrest the housekeeper for perjury.

Historical Note
The film was released in August, 1956.
Nobody was Hanged in the UK between the 12th. August, 1955, and the 23rd July, 1957 which is three weeks short of 2 years.

Cast
Tom Conway as Sir Roderick Strood
Elizabeth Sellars as Daphne, Lady Strood
Eunice Gayson as Elizabeth
Freda Jackson as Mrs. Tucker
Hugh Latimer as Mark Perryman
Ronald Simpson as Dr. Cartwright 
Victor Maddern as Bonaker 
Anthony Newley as Cyril Gaskin 
Margaretta Scott as Mrs. Cranshaw 
Leslie Weston as James Bayfield 
Martin Boddey as Detective Sergeant Horne 
Joan Hickson as Mrs. Prynne 
David Horne as Antony Harcombe, Q.C. 
Walter Hudd as the Judge (Mr. Justice Sarum)
Raymond Huntley as Attorney General 
Harold Siddons as Cheed's Doctor 
Olive Sloane as Mrs. Bayfield
John Schlesinger as Doctor Goldfinger
Gillian Lynne as Gladys, Gaskin's girlfriend

References

External links

1956 films
Films directed by Terence Fisher
1956 crime films
Columbia Pictures films
British crime films
1950s English-language films
1950s British films
British black-and-white films